Twickenham Stadium in Twickenham, south-west London, England, is a rugby union stadium owned by the Rugby Football Union (RFU), English rugby union governing body, which has its headquarters there. The England national rugby union team plays home matches at the stadium.

It is the world‘s largest rugby union stadium, the second largest stadium in the United Kingdom, behind Wembley Stadium, and the fourth largest in Europe.

The Middlesex Sevens, Premiership Rugby fixtures, Anglo-Welsh Cup matches, the Varsity Match between Oxford and Cambridge universities and European Rugby Champions Cup games have been played at Twickenham Stadium. It has also been used as the venue for rugby league Challenge Cup finals and American football, as part of the NFL London Games in 2016 and 2017.

Twickenham Stadium has hosted concerts by Rihanna, Iron Maiden, Bryan Adams, Bon Jovi, Genesis, U2, Beyoncé, The Rolling Stones, The Police, Eagles, R.E.M., Eminem, Lady Gaga, and Metallica.

Overview
Twickenham is often referred to as "the Home of England Rugby". The stadium, owned and operated by the RFU, hosts rugby union fixtures year round. It is the home of the English rugby union team, who play nearly all their home games at the stadium. Twickenham hosts England's home Six Nations matches, as well as inbound touring teams from the Southern Hemisphere, usually annually in November.

Apart from its relationship with the national team, Twickenham is the venue for a number of other domestic and international rugby union matches. It hosts the annual London leg of the World Rugby Sevens Series, the Cup (championship) final and third-place match of the annual London leg of the World Rugby Women's Sevens Series, and the domestic Middlesex Sevens competition. It is also the venue for the Premiership Rugby final as well as Harlequins' Big Game at Christmas time and an additional annual fixture hosted by Harlequins in late spring.  Anglo-Welsh Cup, Heineken Cup and Champions Cup finals have also been held here in the past. The stadium is also host to The Varsity Match between Oxford and Cambridge, the English schools' Daily Mail Cup Final and the Army Navy Match which forms the culmination of the annual Inter-Services Competition.

History
Sold out Tests against New Zealand and South Africa at Crystal Palace saw the RFU realise the benefit of owning their own ground. Committee member William Williams and treasurer William Cail led the way to purchasing a 10.25 acre (4 hectare) market garden in Twickenham in 1907 for £5,500 12s 6d. The first stands were constructed the following year. Before the ground was purchased, it was used to grow cabbages, and so Twickenham Stadium is affectionately known as the Cabbage Patch. After further expenditure on roads, the first game, between Harlequins v. Richmond, was played on 2 October 1909, and the first international, England v. Wales, on 15 January 1910. At the time of the English-Welsh game, the stadium had a maximum capacity of 20,000 spectators. During World War I the ground was used for cattle, horse and sheep grazing. King George V unveiled a war memorial in 1921.

In 1926, the first Middlesex Sevens took place at the ground. In 1927 the first Varsity Match took place at Twickenham for the first time. On 19 March 1938, BBC Television broadcast the EnglandScotland (Calcutta Cup) match from Twickenham, the first time that a rugby match was shown live on television. In 1959, to mark 50 years of the ground, a combined side of England and Wales beat Ireland and Scotland by 26 points to 17.

Coming into the last match of the 1988 season England had lost 15 of their previous 23 matches in the Five Nations Championship. The Twickenham crowd had only seen one solitary England try in the previous two years, and at half-time, they were 0–3 down against the Irish. During the second half, a remarkable transformation took place and England started playing an expansive game many had doubted they were capable of producing. A 0–3 deficit was turned into a 35–3 win, with England scoring six tries. This day also saw the origins of the adoption of the traditional spiritual "Swing Low, Sweet Chariot" as a terrace song. In the 35–3 win against Ireland, three of England's tries were scored by Chris Oti, a black player who had made a reputation for himself that season as a speedster on the left wing. A group of boys from the Benedictine school Douai, following a tradition at their school games, sang "Swing Low, Sweet Chariot" whenever a try was scored. When Oti scored his second try, amused spectators standing close to the boys joined in, and when Oti scored his hat-trick the song was heard around the ground. Since then "Swing Low, Sweet Chariot" has been a song to sing at England home games, in the same way that Fields of Athenry is sung in Dublin and Cwm Rhondda is sung in Cardiff.

The United Kingdom, Ireland and France shared the hosting of the 1991 Rugby World Cup. Twickenham was used during pool A England matches. Twickenham was also host of the 1991 Rugby World Cup Final in which Australia beat England 12–6. For this game, England changed their style of play, opting for the sort of running game that had brought them victory against Ireland in the March 1988 game referred to above. During this match, with the English facing a 12–3 deficit, David Campese reached one-handed for a ball thrown to England winger, Rory Underwood. He dropped it and the ball rolled forward, gifting England a penalty that proved to be the last score of the game. Some have claimed that Campese's action should have been interpreted as a deliberate professional foul, with possible disciplinary action against the Australian player. However, on the same ground in November 1988, Campese had intercepted a similar pass and run the length of the field to score a try.

Some of the Welsh-hosted 1999 Rugby World Cup games were taken to Twickenham. These included three of England's pool B matches, the second round playoff when England defeated Fiji 45 points to 24, and both semi-finals, none of which England were involved in, having made their exit in the quarter-finals at the hands of South Africa. Under the reign of Clive Woodward, the stadium became known as 'Fortress Twickenham', as England enjoyed a run of 19 unbeaten home matches from October 1999, ending with defeat against Ireland in 2004. The IRB Rugby Aid Match was played on 5 March 2005 under the auspices of the International Rugby Board (IRB) to raise money for the United Nations World Food Programme to support its work aiding victims of the 2004 Indian Ocean tsunami. Representative sides of the Northern and Southern hemispheres played at Twickenham. The final score was Northern Hemisphere 19 – Southern Hemisphere 54.

Redevelopment

Since the ground was bought by the RFU in 1907, it has gone through a number of redevelopments. In 1921 a stand was built above the northern terrace, with workshops placed underneath. In 1927, there was an extension to the East Stand, bringing the capacity to 12,000. The south terrace was also extended to allow 20,000 spectators. In 1932 a new West Stand was completed, providing offices for the RFU, who made the ground their home. In 1937, Middlesex County Council approved a scheme submitted by Twickenham Borough Council to widen Rugby Road due to it being inadequate for traffic.

In 1965, the South Terrace was closed due to structural failings. It was found to be cheaper to build a new stand as opposed to repairing the existing one; however, planning permission was refused, due to objection from local residents. Permission was granted in 1978. A period of extensive rebuilding took place during the early 1980s which continued through to the mid-1990s. In 1981 the South Terrace was rebuilt as the South Stand. After being taken down in 1989, an extended North Stand was opened in 1990. After the 1992 Five Nations, the stadium saw the development of the new East Stand and following that the West Stand. In 1995, the stadium was completed to accommodate 75,000 people in an all-seater environment. The North, East and West stands were all built by Mowlem.
Planning permission was sought in 2002 and received in December 2004 for a new South Stand to raise capacity to 82,000, together with a hotel and conference centre, with redevelopment commencing in June 2005. The RFU's revised application to build the new south stand at £80 million was unanimously approved by Richmond Council's planning committee on 2 December. As well as increasing the stadium's capacity to 82,000, the redevelopment introduced a four-star Marriott hotel with 156 rooms and six VIP suites with views over the field, a performing arts complex, a health and leisure club, a new rugby shop and a general increase in function space. On Sunday 10 July 2005 the old south stand was demolished to make way for the new development. The festivities that were planned for the implosion of this end of the stadium were cancelled in the wake of the 7 July terror attacks in the centre of London. The new seating, which had been started by Mowlem, was completed by Carillion on 5 November 2006 in time for the England vs New Zealand game of the 2006 Autumn internationals series, in which England lost in a near-record defeat. 

The rugby stadium continued to be developed into 2018 with the upgrading of the east stand. Not only does the new stand offer game day hospitality, but it also has six floors of event spacing. The east stand was over budget due to additional safety measures put in place to make the redeveloped structure capable of withstanding a bomb attack, and to make it fire proof with work done on the cladding in response to the Grenfell Tower fire. With the upgrade the roof is now finally complete.

Rugby World Cup
Twickenham Stadium has hosted Rugby World Cup Matches in 1991, 1999 and 2015 with England as hosts in 1991 and 2015 therefore holding the Final. The Stadium also hosted semi finals in 1999 including France's 43–31 victory New Zealand.

1991 Rugby World Cup

1999 Rugby World Cup

2015 Rugby World Cup

Other uses

Though Twickenham usually only hosts rugby union fixtures, it has in the past been the venue for a number of other events. In 2000, the ground hosted its first game of rugby league, in which Australia defeated England in the opening game of the 2000 Rugby League World Cup. The Rugby League Challenge Cup Final has also been played at Twickenham twice, in 2001 and 2006, and was won by St. Helens on both occasions.

Due to the construction delays of Wembley, a number of scheduled events at Wembley were moved to Twickenham. The Challenge Cup and the Rolling Stones' A Bigger Bang Tour concerts were taken to Twickenham. The Stones also played two shows at Twickenham in August and September 2003, the first of which was used as their stadium concert disc for the 2003 DVD Four Flicks. During 2007 Genesis played at Twickenham during their reunion tour. The Police played at the stadium in September 2007 and Rod Stewart in June. The usual capacity for concerts is anything up to 50,000, as opposed to the 82,000 for rugby.

R.E.M. performed at Twickenham in August 2008, while New Jersey rockers Bon Jovi played two gigs at the stadium in June 2008 as part of their Lost Highway Tour, and Iron Maiden played there as part of their Somewhere Back in Time World Tour on 5 July 2008, along with a full supporting bill which included Avenged Sevenfold, Within Temptation and Lauren Harris.

Lady Gaga performed two sold-out shows at the stadium during her Born This Way Ball Tour on the 8th and 9 September 2012 with 101,250 people attending for both shows. The first date broke a record for The Fastest Selling-out Stadium Show in UK history when the 50,625 tickets for the first show sold out in 50 seconds.

Rihanna performed two shows at the stadium during her Diamonds World Tour on 15 and 16 June 2013 for 95,971 people for both nights.

Since the mid-1950s it has also hosted the Jehovah's Witnesses annual convention for the London area. Usually up to 25,000 attend to hear Bible talks.

The TV motoring show Top Gear used the pitch for a match of rugby, played using Kia cars. This was played prior to resurfacing.

Concerts

American football

It was announced on 3 November 2015 that the RFU and America's National Football League had agreed a three-year deal to host at least three NFL London Games. The deal began in October 2016 and gave the opportunity to host an additional two games over the three-year period of the deal.

On 23 October 2016, the Los Angeles Rams hosted the New York Giants at Twickenham Stadium. This was the second of three London Games in 2016, with the others being played at Wembley. The game was televised live in the UK on BBC Two.

The final two games of the agreement were played in 2017, with matchups announced on 13 December 2016.

World Rugby Museum
The World Rugby Museum is a museum located in Twickenham Stadium. The museum covers the whole of the global game, not just English rugby union. It tells the history of the sport, including William Webb Ellis and Richard Lindon, using interactive display techniques. The museum has a rolling programme of special exhibitions which cover topical issues and offer an opportunity to display some of the obscurer items in the collection. Some unique displays include an English rugby union jersey from the first ever rugby union international in 1871 between England and Scotland, and (until 2005) the William Webb Ellis Cup which was obtained by England at the 2003 Rugby World Cup. Twickenham Stadium Tours are also available through the Museum and run four times per day (Tuesday to Saturday) and twice on Sundays. It is usually open every day of the week except for Mondays. Except match days when, for ticket holders only, a special price entry to the museum is available.

See also
 Rugby union in England
 Sport in London
 Twickenham Streaker (disambiguation)

References

Further reading
Harris, Ed, (2005). Twickenham: The History of the Cathedral of Rugby, Sports Books,
Spragg, Iain, (2010). Twickenham – 100 Years of Rugby's HQ, Vision Sports Publishing,

External links

 

1909 establishments in England
Buildings and structures in the London Borough of Richmond upon Thames
Sports venues completed in 1909
Music venues in London
Sports venues in London
United Kingdom
Rugby League World Cup stadiums
Rugby union stadiums in London
Rugby World Cup stadiums
Sport in the London Borough of Richmond upon Thames
Twickenham
Rugby union in Middlesex
Tourist attractions in the London Borough of Richmond upon Thames
National Football League venues
American football venues in the United Kingdom
World Rugby Sevens Series venues